Marinus Bernardus "Benno" de Goeij (born on 19 March 1975) is a Dutch record producer. He is best known for his participation in Rank 1 with Piet Bervoets, Kamaya Painters with Tiësto and Gaia with Armin van Buuren. Since 2008, de Goeij has been the co-producer behind the Dutch trance artists Armin van Buuren and Jochen Miller.

History

Early years (1997–1998) 
Benno de Goeij began working as a producer in 1997 alongside Piet Bervoets whom he met at a party. They decided to create music of their own and created the duo Pedro & Benno with singles "Scream For Love", "Talkin' To You", and "Speechless" released under Karma Records. They also created tracks under various aliases like Precious People, Gualagara, A.I.D.A., Simplistic Mind, Two Disciples, R.O.O.S.

The Rank 1 project (1998–2003) 

In 1998, Rank 1 was born as they thought it would be a perfect joke to see a group named Rank 1 at a number 1 position. This joke became real when "Airwave" hit numerous charts at that position. They also remixed Cygnus X's "Superstring" song and released an anthem for Sensation in 2001 known as "Such Is Life" from the album Symsonic. In 2003, they re-released "Breathing" which was another charting track since it was a more break beat version of "Airwave". In 1998, Tiësto and de Goeij created Kamaya Painters, with three successful singles.

Work outside of Rank 1 (2004–present) 
In 2007, his first work with Armin van Buuren was created, it featured Kush and was entitled "This World Is Watching Me"; The song was written by de Goeij along with van Buuren, Sacha Collisson, Zoe Durrant and Pete Kirtley. As of then de Goeij began helping Armin on his next studio album. In early 2008 Rank 1 collaborated with Jochen Miller on the song "And Then..." which was written, composed, and arranged by de Goeij. In 2008, Armin van Buuren released his third studio album, Imagine, which included de Goeij's writing and production abilities in all songs except for "Imagine", "Fine Without You", and "Intricacy".

In 2010, he co-wrote and co-produced all tracks on Mirage except for "Minack", and in 2013 he did it again on Intense (all tracks) and Embrace (except "Looking for Your Name").

He and Armin have also co-produced songs under the alias Gaia; at the 2014 Ultra Music Festival, the two producers performed for the first time as a group as part of the A State of Trance 650: New Horizons show on the final day of the festival.

Discography

Singles 
As Rank 1
Singles
 1999 Rank 1 – "Black Snow / The Citrus Juicer"
 1999 Rank 1 – "Airwave (Innercity Theme 1999)"
 2001 Rank 1 feat. Shanokee – "Such Is Life (Sensation Anthem 2001)"
 2002 Rank 1 – "Awakening"
 2003 Rank 1 – "Breathing (Airwave 2003)"
 2003 Rank 1 feat. Shanokee – "It's Up to You (Symsonic)"
 2004 Rank 1 – "Unreleased Tracks from the Album Symsonic: Conspiracy / Cosmomatic / Down from the Deep"
 2004 Rank 1 – "Beats at Rank-1 Dotcom (Trance Energy Anthem 2005) / After Me"
 2005 Rank 1 – "Opus 17 / Top Gear"
 2007 Armin van Buuren vs. Rank 1 feat. Kush – "This World Is Watching Me"
 2007 Alex M.O.R.P.H. vs. Rank 1 – "Life Less Ordinary"
 2008 Rank 1 vs. Jochen Miller – "And Then..."
 2009 Rank 1 – "L.E.D. There Be Light (Trance Energy Anthem 2009)"
 2009 Rank 1 – "Symfo (Sunrise Festival Theme 2009)"
 2010 Rank 1 vs. Jochen Miller – "The Great Escape (enTrance Theme 2010)"
 2010 Nic Chagall, Rank 1 & Wippenberg – "100"
 2012 Rank 1 & Jochen Miller feat. Sarah Bettens – "Wild and Perfect Day"
 2012 Cerf, Mitiska & Jaren with Rank 1 – "Witness"
 2012 Rank 1 – "7 Instead of 8"
 2013 Rank 1 vs. M.I.K.E. – "Elements of Nature"
 2013 Rank 1 – "Floorlifter"
 2013 Rank 1 – "13.11.11"
 2014 Rank 1 & Dennis Sheperd – "Freudenrausch"
 2014 Rank 1 – "Airwave (21st Century Mix)"
 2015 Rank 1 vs. M.I.K.E. Push – "Juno"
2015 Rank 1 vs M.I.K.E. Push – "Zenith"
2016 Rank 1 – "Superstring"
2016 York & Rank 1 feat. Lola – "This World Is So Amazing"
2019 Marco V & Rank 1 – "We Finally Met"

Albums
 2002 Rank 1 – Symsonic

Remixes
 1999 York – Reachers of Civilization "(Rank 1 Remix)"
 2000 Tunnel Allstars – Blue Lagoon "(Rank 1 Remixes)"
 2000 System F – Cry "(Rank 1 Remix)"
 2000 Mary Griffin – "Perfect Moment (Rank 1 Remix)"
 2000 Cygnus X – "Superstring (Rank 1 Remixes)"
 2000 Baby D – "Let Me Be Your Fantasy (Rank 1 Remixes)"
 2000 Angelic – "It's My Turn (Rank 1 Remix)"
 2000 Chakra – "Home (Rank 1 Remix)" [Unreleased]
 2001 Ayumi Hamasaki – "Far Away (Rank 1 Remix)"
 2001 Delerium feat. Rani – "Underwater (Rank 1 Remixes)"
 2002 Gouryella – "Ligaya (Rank 1 Remix)" [Unreleased]
 2002 Nu NRG – "Dreamland (Rank 1 Re-Edit)"
 2002 Ayumi Hamasaki – "Dearest (Rank 1 Edit)"
 2002 Marc Aurel – "Sound of Love (Rank 1 Remix)"
 2002 DuMonde – "Mind Made Up (Rank 1 Remix)"
 2003 M.I.K.E. – "Journey of Life (Rank 1 Remix)"
 2004 Angel City – "Touch Me (Rank 1 Remix)"
 2005 Mr Sam – Lyteo "(Rank 1 Remix)"
 2005 ATB – Humanity "(Rank 1 Remix)"
 2006 Ronald van Gelderen – "This Way (Rank 1 Remix)"
 2006 Freddie Mercury – "Love Kills (Rank 1 Remixes)"
 2007 Cosmic Gate – "Analog Feel (Rank 1's Digital Re-hash)"
 2007 JOOP – "The Future (Trance Energy Anthem 2007) (Rank 1 Remix)"
 2007 Alex Bartlett & Guess feat. Anthya – "Touch the Sun (Rank 1 Remix)"
 2008 Anton Sonin & AMX feat. Sari – "Undone (Rank 1 Remix)"
 2008 Marcel Woods feat. MC Da Silva – "On Fire (Rank 1's No This Ain't Trance Like '99 Remix)"
 2008 Ronald van Gelderen – "Embrace Me (Rank 1 Remix)"
 2008 Leon Bolier vs. Jonas Steur – "Lost Luggage (Rank 1 Remix)"
 2010 Velvetine – "Safe (Wherever You Are) (Rank 1 Remix)"
 2010 Mat Zo – "24 Hours (Rank 1 Remix)"
 2011 Cosmic Gate – "Fire Wire (Rank 1 Remix)"
 2011 Super8 & Tab feat. Julie Thompson – "My Enemy (Rank 1 Remix)"
 2013 Conjure One feat. Leigh Nash – "Under the Gun (Rank 1 Remixes)"
 2013 Giuseppe Ottaviani feat. Eric Lumiere – "Love Will Bring It All Around (Rank 1 Remix)"

Co-productions 
Various projects
 1997 Precious People – Baby Freak
 1997 Precious People – Reflections of Love
 1997 Pedro & Benno – Scream for Love
 1997 Simplistic Mind – Human Beast
 1998 Benno – Freefall
 1998 Two Disciples – To the Church
 1998 Tritone – I Know You're There
 1998 Jonah – Ssst... (Listen)
 1998 R.O.O.S. - Living in a Dream
 1998 Control Freaks – Subspace Interference
 1998 System Eight – Play it Rough
 1998 Pedro & Benno – Talkin' to You
 1998 Kamaya Painters – "Endless Wave / Northern Spirit / Outstream"
 1999 Gualagara – Human Planetarium
 1999 Pedro & Benno – Speechless
 1999 R.O.O.S. - Body, Mind & Spirit
 1999 Van Gils & Benno De Goeij – I Don't Need You Anymore
 1999 A.I.D.A. - Far and Away / Merit
 1999 Kamaya Painters – Far from Over / Cryptomnesia / Soft Light
 1999 A.I.D.A. - Remember Me / Corvana
 1999 Dutch Force – Deadline
 1999 AMbassador – One of These Days
 1999 Phil Rodriguez – Closer (R.O.O.S.Remix)
 1999 Nudge & Shouter – Blue Lagoon (Bervoets & De Goeij Remix)
 1999 Pound & Harris – Formanterra (Bervoets & De Goeij Remix)
 1999 Chicane – Lost You Somewhere (R.O.O.S. Remix)
 1999 Cepheus 1 – Cut D Mid-Range (Bervoets & De Goeij Remix)
 1999 Fourth Inc. - Trip to Julich (Bervoets & De Goeij Remix)
 1999 Cygnus X – The Orange Theme (Bervoets & De Goeij Remix)
 1999 Choopie & Ronie – Let It Go (Bervoets & De Goeij Remix)
 1999 Neon – Getting Around (Bervoets & De Goeij Remix)
 1999 Jens – Psycho Strings '99 (Bervoets & De Goeij Remix)
 1999 Locus – Don't Give Up (A.I.D.A. Remix)
 2000 Kamaya Painters – Wasteland / Summerbreeze
 2000 Jonah – Yeah... Right
 2000 SPX – Straight to the Point
 2000 Legato – Small Town Boy (Bervoets & De Goeij Remix)
 2000 DJ Jurgen – Higher & Higher (Dutch Force Remix)
 2000 DJ Mellow D – At Night (Dutch Force Remix)
 2001 M.O.R.P.H. - Maximum Overdrive (Benicio Remix)
 2002 Allice Deejay – Will I Ever (Dutch Force Remix)
 2002 M.O.R.P.H. - Consequence (Benicio Remix)
 2002 Hands On Devine – Step By Step (Benicio Remix)
 2003 Jacob And Mendez – Deception (Benicio Remix)
 2003 Mac J – Perfect Blend / Deep Ranger
 2004 Mac J – Nightware / Womaniser
 2005 Johan Gielen – Dreamchild
 2005 JOOP – The World / Another World
 2006 Ronald van Gelderen – This Way
 2006 Ronald van Gelderen – Realize
 2007 Ronald van Gelderen – Dirty Rocker
 2008 Ronald van Gelderen – Embrace Me
 2010 Artento Divini – Griffin (Pleasure Island Anthem 2010)
 2011 Within Temptation – Sinéad (Benno de Goeij Remix)
 2014 Ayu – Terminal

With Jochen Miller
Singles
 2008 Jochen Miller – "Lost Connection"
 2008 Jochen Miller – "9 Minutes / Eclipse"
 2009 Jochen Miller – "Face Value"
 2009 Jochen Miller – "Brace Yourself"
 2009 Jochen Miller – "Red One"
 2010 Jochen Miller – "Humanoid"
 2010 Jochen Miller – "Classified (Energy Theme 2011)"
 2010 Jochen Miller – "uPad"
 2011 Jochen Miller – "U and Eye"
 2011 Jochen Miller – "Troucid"
 2011 Jochen Miller – "One Day"
 2011 Jochen Miller – "Flashback"
 2011 Jochen Miller – "Bamm!"
 2012 Jochen Miller – "Zodiac"
 2012 Jochen Miller – "Leap of Faith (Emporium Anthem 2012)"

Remixes
 2010 Markus Schulz feat. Khaz – "Dark Heart Waiting (Jochen Miller Remix)"
 2010 Cosmic Gate – "Back 2 Earth (Jochen Miller Remix)"

With Armin van Buuren
 2008 Armin van Buuren with DJ Shah feat. Chris Jones – "Going Wrong"
 2008 Armin van Buuren feat. Jaren – "Unforgivable"
 2008 Armin van Buuren feat. Jacqueline Govaerts – "Never Say Never"
 2008 Armin van Buuren feat. feat. Audrey Gallagher – "Hold On to Me"
 2008 Armin van Buuren "Face to Face"
 2008 Armin van Buuren feat. Cathy Burtin – "Rain"
 2008 Armin van Buuren feat. Sharon Den Adel – "In and Out of Love"
 2008 Armin van Buuren feat. Vera Ostrova – "What If"
 2009 Armin van Buuren presents Gaia – "Tuvan"
 2009 Armin van Buuren feat. VanVelzen – "Broken Tonight"
 2010 Armin van Buuren – "Full Focus"
 2010 Armin van Buuren feat. Susana – "Desidirium 207"
 2010 Armin van Buuren – "Mirage"
 2010 Armin van Buuren feat. Christian Burns – "This Light Between Us"
 2010 Armin van Buuren feat. Sophie Ellis-Bextor – "Not Giving Up on Love"
 2010 Armin van Buuren – "I Don't Own You"
 2010 Armin van Buuren feat. Winter Kills – "Take a Moment"
 2010 Armin van Buuren feat. Nadia Ali – "Feels So Good"
 2010 Armin van Buuren feat. Sophie Hunter – "Virtual Friend"
 2010 Armin van Buuren feat. Laura V – "Drowning"
 2010 Armin van Buuren feat. Ana Criado – "Down to Love"
 2010 Armin van Buuren – "Coming Home"
 2010 Armin van Buuren feat. BT – "These Silent Hearts"
 2010 Armin van Buuren – "Orbion"
 2010 Armin van Buuren feat. Adam Young – "Youtopia"
 2010 Armin van Buuren feat. Fiora – "Breathe in Deep"
 2010 Armin van Buuren feat. Van Velzen – "Take Me Where I Wanna Go"
 2010 Armin van Buuren feat. Cathy Burton – "I Surrender"
 2010 Armin van Buuren feat. Jessie Morgan – "Love Too Hard"
 2010 Armin van Buuren presents Gaia – "Aisha"
 2011 Armin van Buuren presents Gaia – "Status Excessu D (A State of Trance #500 Anthem)"
 2011 Armin van Buuren presents Gaia – "Stellar"
 2011 ATB & Armin van Buuren – "Vice Versa"
 2012 Armin van Buuren presents Gaia – "J'ai Envie De Toi"
 2012 Armin van Buuren – "We Are Here to Make Some Noise"
 2013 Armin van Buuren & Markus Schulz – "The Expedition (A State of Trance #600 Anthem)"
 2013 Armin van Buuren & W&W – "D# Fat"
 2013 Armin van Buuren presents Gaia – "Humming the Lights"
 2013 Armin van Buuren feat. Fiora – "Waiting for the Night"
 2013 Armin van Buuren feat. Trevor Guthrie – "This Is What It Feels Like"
 2013 Armin van Buuren feat. Miri Ben-Ari – "Intense"
 2013 Armin van Buuren feat. Cindy Alma – "Beautiful Life"
 2013 Armin van Buuren – "Pulsar"
 2013 Armin van Buuren feat. Laura Jansen – "Sound of the Drums"
 2013 Armin van Buuren feat. Lauren Evans – "Alone"
 2013 Armin van Buuren vs. NERVO feat. Laura V – "Turn This Love Around"
 2013 Armin van Buuren feat. Aruna – "Won't Let You Go"
 2013 Armin van Buuren – "In 10 Years from Now"
 2013 Armin van Buuren – "Last Stop Before Heaven"
 2013 Armin van Buuren feat. Emma Hewitt – "Forever Is Ours"
 2013 Armin van Buuren feat. Richard Bedford – "Love Never Came"
 2013 Armin van Buuren – "Who's Afraid of 138?!"
 2013 Armin van Buuren feat. Bagga Bownz – "Reprise"
 2014 Armin van Buuren feat. Cindy Alma – "Don't Want to Fight Love Away"
 2014 Armin van Buuren – "Save My Night"
 2014 Armin van Buuren presents Gaia – "Empire of Hearts"
 2014 Armin van Buuren – "Ping Pong"
 2014 Armin van Buuren – "Hystereo"
 2015 Armin van Buuren – "Together (in a State of Trance) (ASOT Festival Anthem)"
2015 Armin van Buuren presents Rising Star feat. Betsie Larkin – "Safe Inside You"
 2015 Armin van Buuren presents Gaia – "In Principio"
 2015 Armin van Buuren presents Gaia – "Carnation"
2015 Armin van Buuren feat. Mr Probz – "Another You"
2015 Armin van Buuren feat. Cimo Fränkel – "Strong Ones"
2015 Armin van Buuren feat. Eric Vloeimans – "Embrace"
2015 Armin van Buuren feat. Kensington – "Heading Up High"
2015 Armin van Buuren feat. BullySongs – "Freefall"
2015 Armin van Buuren feat. BullySongs – "Caught in the Slipstream"
2015 Armin van Buuren feat. Rock Mafia – "Hands to Heaven"
2015 Hardwell & Armin van Buuren – "Off the Hook"
2015 Armin van Buuren – "Old Skool"
2015 Armin van Buuren feat. DBX – "Indestructible"
2015 Armin van Buuren & Cosmic Gate – "Embargo"
2015 Armin van Buuren feat. Angel Taylor – "Make It Right"
2015 Armin van Buuren feat. Lyrica Anderson – "Gotta Be Love"
2015 Armin van Buuren feat. Sarah deCourcey – "Face of Summer"
2016 Armin van Buuren presents Rising Star feat. Betsie Larkin – "Again" (Armin van Buuren Remix)
 2016 Armin van Buuren presents Gaia – "Inyathi"
 2017 Armin van Buuren presents Gaia – "Saint Vitus"
2017 Armin van Buuren feat. Josh Cumbee – "Sunny Days"
2017 Armin van Buuren presents Gaia – "Crossfire"

Albums
2008 Armin van Buuren – Imagine
2010 Armin van Buuren – Mirage
2013 Armin van Buuren – Intense
2015 Armin van Buuren – Embrace

Remixes
 2008 Kerli – "Walking on Air (Armin van Buuren Remixes)"
 2008 The Killers – "Human (Armin van Buuren Remixes)"
 2009 BT feat. Jes – "Every Other Way (Armin van Buuren Remix)"
 2010 Faithless – "Not Going Home (Armin van Buuren Remixes)"
 2010 Dido – "Everything to Lose (Armin van Buuren Remix)"
 2010 Miguel Bosé – "Jurame (Armin van Buuren Remix)"
 2011 Nadine Coyle – "Put Your Hands Up (Armin Van Buuren Remix)"
 2011 Emma Hewitt – "Colours (Armin van Buuren Remix)"
 2011 Hannah – "Falling Away (Armin van Buuren Remix)"
 2011 David Guetta feat. Usher – "Without You (Armin van Buuren Remix)"
 2011 Wiegel Meirmans Snitker – "Nova Zembla (Armin van Buuren Remix)"

References 

1975 births
Living people
Dutch trance musicians
People from Oud-Beijerland